Covers 2 is the second English-language cover album released by Beni Arashiro under her new label Universal Music Japan under the mononym Beni on November 7, 2012.
This album handles the same concept of Covers, which featured Beni covering songs from popular Japanese male singers in Japan and translating the lyrics to English.

Background

Covers 2 is the second cover album released by Beni. She recorded the album in Los Angeles, California. She performed a few of the songs at The Hotel Cafe, including "Uta Utai no Ballad", from which video footage was filmed and used in the music video of the song. "I Love You" was recorded in Los Angeles as well.

Track listing

Charts
Oricon Overall Sales Chart (Japan)

References 

2012 albums
Beni (singer) albums
Covers albums